Carlota Alfaro (born June 4, 1933) is a high fashion designer. She is known as "Puerto Rico's grande dame of fashion".

Biography
Alfaro was born in Santurce, Puerto Rico and showed a passion for design ever since she was a child, often designing clothes for family and friends.  She was raised in Santurce where her aunt taught her how to sew.

Alfaro reached international fame in Latin America, Europe and the United States during the 1960s, decade in which she also created the Instituto Carlota Alfaro, aimed towards passing on her knowledge to young fashion design students. Alfaro's specialty is haute couture. During the 1980s, she published a series of designs in a local newspaper's fashion column, called .  Her signature dress is the exaggerated mermaid cut.

Alfaro has received many international awards, and her collections have been sold at stores around the world, including Neiman Marcus, Bloomingdales and Saks Fifth Avenue.

See also

 List of Puerto Ricans
 History of women in Puerto Rico

References

1933 births
Living people
Puerto Rican fashion designers
Puerto Rican non-fiction writers
People from Santurce, Puerto Rico